The Chevrolet Suburban is a series of automobiles built by the Chevrolet division of General Motors. The name started in 1934 for the 1935 U.S. model year, making it the longest continuously used automobile nameplate in production. It has traditionally been one of General Motors' most profitable vehicles. The 1935 first generation Carryall Suburban was one of the first production all-metal bodied station wagons. It now has a full-size SUV body style and comes with three engine options:  a 5.3 liter V8, 6.2 liter V8 or a 3.0 liter Inline-6 turbo diesel.

The Suburban was additionally produced under the GMC marque until the GMC version was rebranded as the Yukon XL.  It was also briefly marketed as a Holden. For most of its recent history, the Suburban has been a station wagon−bodied version of the Chevrolet pickup truck, including the Chevrolet C/K and Silverado series of truck-based vehicles. Cadillac offers a version called the Escalade ESV.

The Suburban is sold in the United States, Canada, Central America, Chile, Dominican Republic, Bolivia, Mexico, Peru, Philippines, and the Middle East (except Israel) while the Yukon XL is sold only in North America (exclusive to the United States, Canada and Mexico) and the Middle East territories (except Israel).

A 2018 iSeeCars.com study identified the Chevrolet Suburban as the car that is driven the most each year. A 2019 iSeeCars.com study named the Chevrolet Suburban the second-ranked longest-lasting vehicle.

In December 2019, the Hollywood Chamber of Commerce unveiled a Hollywood Walk of Fame star for the Suburban, noting that the Suburban had been in "1,750 films and TV shows since 1952."

History
Several automotive companies in the United States used the "Suburban" designation to indicate a windowed, station wagon type body on a commercial frame including DeSoto, Dodge, Plymouth, Studebaker, Nash, Chevrolet, and GMC. The (Westchester) Suburban name was, in fact, a trademark of U.S. Body and Forging Co. of Tell City, Indiana, which built wooden station wagon bodies for all of these automobile and light truck chassis and more.

Chevrolet began production of its all-steel "carryall-suburban" in 1934. GMC brought out its version in 1937. These vehicles were also known as the "Suburban Carryall" until GM shortened the name to simply "Suburban". GMC's equivalent to the Chevrolet model was originally named "Suburban" as well, until being rebranded as "Yukon XL" for the 2000 model year.

With the end of production of the Dodge Town Wagon in 1966 and the Plymouth Fury Suburban station wagon in 1978, only General Motors continued to manufacture a vehicle branded as a "Suburban", and GM was awarded an exclusive trademark on the name in 1988. The Chevrolet Suburban is one of the largest SUVs on the market today. It has outlasted competitive vehicles such as the International Harvester Travelall, Jeep Wagoneer, and the Ford Excursion. The latest competitor is the extended Ford Expedition EL, which replaced the Excursion.

The Suburban of today is a full-size SUV (upgraded to extended length from 1967 onward to make room for the then-new K5 Blazer that debuted in 1969) with three rows of seating, a full pickup truck frame, and V8 engine. It is one of the few station wagons available with all bench rows. The Suburban is the same height and width as the Chevrolet Tahoe, although the Suburban is  longer. The extra length provides a full-sized cargo area behind the 9 passenger seating area.

From 1973 to 2013, and again from 2016 to 2020, it had been available in half-ton and 3/4-ton versions. Chevrolet discontinued this option for the public during the tenth generation model's tenure in 2013 due to slow sales. It would return as an exclusive to rental, fleet, and government services with the eleventh generation starting with the 2016 model year with a 4WD LS and LT trim option, but soft sales would result in Chevrolet discontinuing production on this feature in 2020.

In recent years, the Suburban has been used as a police truck, fire chief's vehicle, or EMS vehicle. Suburbans are also used as limousines. Gothic black Suburban vehicles are commonly used by federal intelligence services, such as Secret Service for example. Secret Service operates fully armored versions of the Suburban for the President of the United States when he attends less formal engagements. The Suburban (as well as the Tahoe and GMC variants) is very popular with the Federal Bureau of Investigation as a service vehicle.

In the late 1990s, GM also introduced a RHD version of the Suburban, badged as a Holden, for the Australian market. Sales were low and GM withdrew the model in 2000 from Holden's lineup. In 2019, Chevrolet looked at bringing the Suburban back to the region as a converted RWD import through Holden Special Vehicles but using the Chevrolet badge, but is holding off on those plans because of numerous factors and partly due to the situation involving GM's decision to retire the Holden brand in 2020.

In 2015, the Suburban commemorated its 80th anniversary at General Motors Arlington Assembly Plant where the 10 millionth Suburban was produced. A video was posted on Chevrolet's YouTube channel about its eighty-year legacy.
 
In a February 26, 2018 article celebrating the vehicle's 83rd year, Car and Driver notes that the Suburban's longevity is due to being one of GM's best selling brands, its appeal to customers across the board regardless of race, gender, class, or political affiliation, and a unique loyalty to the SUV. In an interview from Chevrolet's truck/SUV marketing executive Sandor Piszar, who recalls an event celebrating the truck division's 100th anniversary when they asked about what they named their vehicles, "It's a funny question, but it really is an intriguing point," Piszar says. "People name what they love. And they love their Suburbans."

On December 5, 2019, The Chevrolet Suburban became the first vehicle to be awarded a star on the Hollywood Walk of Fame by the Hollywood Chamber of Commerce for its excellence in film and television, having appeared in more than 1,750 films and television series since 1952, and can also claim to have appeared in at least one television series every year since 1956, and at least one film every year since 1960, the most ever for an automobile of any type. The star, placed at the corner of Hollywood Boulevard and Highland Avenue, will also carry the Chevrolet "Bowtie" symbol instead of the entertainment symbols (film, stage, television, radio, musical instruments, and recording artist), another first for the Walk of Fame.

There have been a total of twelve generations of Chevrolet Suburbans since its 1934 debut, the latest due to go on sale in spring 2020 as a 2021 model.

First generation (1935) 

Prior to the first generation Suburban, in 1933 the Chevrolet Master had offered a station wagon body built on the 1/2 ton truck frame. This model was specifically built for National Guard and Civilian Conservation Corps units. Much of the body was constructed from wood and could seat up to eight occupants.

The actual first-generation model was offered by Chevrolet as a "Carryall Suburban" – a utility vehicle featuring a station wagon body on the chassis of a small truck. Focused on functionality, the concept was indeed to "carry all": the whole family and their gear were to find sufficient space in one truck. It shared the front sheet metal and frames of the half-ton pickup models of the same year, but featured all-metal wagon bodies differing very little in shape from contemporary "woodie" station wagons.

Seating for up to eight occupants was available, with three in the front row, two in the middle row, and three in the rear row. Either the side-hinged rear panel doors or a rear tailgate/lift window could be selected for cargo area access while only having two doors for passenger access.

Second generation (1941) 

Suburbans were built in model years 1941, 1942, and 1946. It was also produced during the war as a military transport vehicle. Seating for up to eight occupants was available. Models with rear panel doors were designated "3106," while those with tailgates were designated "3116." The Chevrolet versions were equipped a 216-cubic-inch 6-cylinder engine. The GMC version was equipped with a 228-cubic-inch 6-cylinder engine. It shared much of its mechanicals with the AK Series trucks.

Third generation (1947) 

This model generation was based on the Chevrolet Advance Design series of pickups.

Beginning in 1953, the Hydra-Matic 4-speed automatic transmission was available in GMC models and in the 1954 model year Chevrolet Suburbans. Models with rear panel doors were designated "3106," while those with tailgates were designated "3116." In 1952, the Suburban came with either a tailgate or panel doors. The front bench seat was split, with two seats on the driver's side and a single seat on the passenger side, which slid forward for access to the rear two rows of seats. The second row was a "2/3" seat, requiring occupants to move past the front passenger seat, as well as the second-row seats to access the third row.

This was the last series to feature "Canopy express" models.

The design of the 1947 Suburban would inspire the design of the Chevrolet HHR over half a century later.

Fourth generation (1955) 

Updated engineering and styling on Chevrolet trucks was not introduced until March 25, 1955, in the middle of the model year that GM called the Chevrolet Task Force/GMC Blue Chip series. All Chevrolet and GMC truck models received new styling that included a flatter hood, front fenders flush with the body and a trapezoid grille. The trucks' V-shaped speedometer was shared with passenger car models.

Engines included I-6 and the small-block V8s.
Chevrolet used its 265 V8 engine, later evolving it to a 283-cubic-inch version. GMC based their V8 on a Pontiac design. Standard Suburban model numbers continued from the previous series, but the introduction of four-wheel-drive models in 1957 added the numbers "3156" for 4WD Suburbans with panel doors, and "3166" for 4WD Suburbans with tailgates.

The "Suburban" name was also used on GM's fancy 2-door GMC 100 series pickup trucks from 1955 to 1959, called the Suburban Pickup, which was similar to the Chevrolet Cameo Carrier, but it was dropped at the same time as Chevy's Cameo in March 1958 when GM released the new all-steel "Fleetside" bed option replacing the Cameo / Suburban Pickup fiberglass bedsides. The Suburban name was never used again on a 1/2 ton pickup after the discontinuance of the Suburban Pickup. Although not documented due to a fire that destroyed the records, the production of Suburban Pickups is understood to be 300 or fewer each model year it was offered from 1955 to 1958.

Fifth generation (1960) 

The styling of the 1960 – 1961 model year took cues from the late 1950s Chevrolet vehicles and had large oval ports above the grille. Front independent suspension was new for 1960. The cab featured a "wrap around" windshield, while tailgate and panel door rear openings were available.

From 1962 onwards, the hood styling was more conservative, with hoods that eliminated the large ports. In 1964, the front glass area was updated to a flatter windshield and larger door glass.  of cargo could be carried in the back.

This model series introduced a factory-equipped 4WD ("K") option for the first time. The 2WD ("C") models introduced a torsion bar-based independent front suspension and trailing arm and coil spring rear, but by 1963, returned to a more conventional coil-spring approach.

Engine options included I-6 and small-block V8s. A  GMC V6 engine was also available on GMC models. This 305 was actually from GMCs medium-duty truck line. It featured high torque but was also notable for poor fuel economy. Transmissions were a 3-speed and 4-speed manual, the automatic Powerglide, and the dual-range Hydramatic in the GMC models.

A 15-passenger conversion was done by Stageway of Fort Smith, Ark.

One ton (C-30),  panel truck models were no longer available after 1966.

Chevrolet Veraneio (Brazil) 

In 1964, Chevrolet in Brazil introduced a 5-door version of the Suburban called C-1416 (known as Veraneio from 1969 onwards, which is Portuguese for "summertime"). It was based on the contemporary Brazilian Chevrolet C-14. Like the C-14, the C-1416/Veraneio used the instrument cluster from the US C/K series although the exterior sheet metal layout is exclusive to Brazil. It was initially powered with a Chevrolet 4.2 L inline-six based on the pre-1962 "Stovebolt" engines. Later it used the 250-CID 4.1 L engine from Chevrolet's Brazilian mid-size sedan – the Opala. The original version of the Veraneio was kept in production, with another grille and interior, until 1988 (model year 1989), but it was eventually replaced with an updated version based on the Série 20 family. The second generation of Veraneio was produced from 1989 to 1995.

In 1997, GM introduced the then-current North American pickups to the Brazilian market, replacing the long running C-series. The Brazilian version of the Suburban was also converted to the current generation at the time and lasted until 2001 as the "Grand Blazer", succeeding the Veraneio.

In 2015, Autoweek ranked the Veraneio fourth among Chevrolet station wagons never sold in the US. It also cited the vehicle's design as "baroque" and summed it up as "a 1960s Brazilian crossover." Autoweek noted that the Veraneio is eligible for import to the United States under the 25-year exemption.

Sixth generation (1967) 

The sixth-generation Suburban debuted alongside the "Action-Line" generation of C/K trucks.  Growing in size over its International Travelall rival, the Suburban moved from a 115-inch to a 127-inch wheelbase (shared by pickup trucks with 8-foot beds).  In another change, a ¾-ton C-20 Suburban was introduced for the first time.  Alongside the standard rear-wheel drive configuration, 4x4 K-10/K-20 models were also offered.   

In a configuration distinct to this generation, Action-Line Suburbans are configured with a single driver-side door and two passenger doors.  For 1969, the Suburban was joined by the shorter K5 Blazer (GMC Jimmy), a two-door utility vehicle with a lift-off hardtop.

The rear-wheel drive Suburban was also available as a panel truck for commercial purposes.  Following the 1970 model year, the configuration was retired, with the model functionally replaced by the G-Series Chevrolet Van/GMC VanDura for 1971.     

Through its production, the Action-Line Suburban shared a large amount of mechanical commonality with its pickup-truck counterpart, sharing the same powertrain offerings.  A 250 cubic-inch inline-6 was standard, with a 292 cubic-inch inline-6 offered as an option.  Small-block V8s initially were 283 and 327 V8s (later 307 and 350 V8s); a 396 (402) V8 served as a large-block V8 offering.  GMC Suburbans were fitted with a 305 V6 as a standard engine until 1970.    

Sharing the styling revisions of Action-Line pickup trucks, the Suburban introduced front disc brakes for 1971.  Automatic-transmission vehicles received an optional tilting steering column.  For 1972, the optional rear-seat air conditioning was redesigned with a smaller housing (previously fitted with a housing that ran the full length of the roof).       

The Action-Line Suburban was produced alongside the rapid growth of the recreational vehicle market in the late 1960s.  While only about 6,200 Suburbans were produced for 1967, by 1972, production had grown to approximately 27,000.  Alongside the retirement of the panel truck configuration, this generation marked the final use of the GMC Carryall name.  The 1972 Suburban was also the final version to use a coil-sprung rear axle, until the introduction of independent rear suspension nearly 50 years later on the current twelfth-generation T1Y Suburban (introduced for 2021).

Seventh generation (1973) 

For 1973, the Suburban became part of the Rounded-Line C/K series, with both the Chevrolet and GMC divisions adopting the Suburban namepate.  Growing nominally in size over its Action-Line predecessor, the seventh-generation Suburban completely abandoned its carryall past, introducing a station wagon-style body with four full passenger doors (more than a decade after its Wagoneer and Travelall rivals).  As the term sport-utility vehicle was more closely associated with off-road vehicles (such as the K5 Blazer), GM designated the Suburban as a truck-based station wagon.  

From the rear of the passenger doors, the Suburban shared its bodywork (both its doors and roofline) with the C/K crew-cab pickup (a new configuration introduced for 1973).  The ½-ton and ¾-ton 10 and 20 payload series made their return alongside the rear-wheel drive C-series and 4x4 K-series.  Alongside the long-running twin-panel rear doors, the Suburban adopted an optional tailgate-style rear door with a retractable rear window (lowered manually or electrically).  

Initially offered in Custom, Custom Deluxe, and Cheyenne Super trims, the Chevrolet Suburban adopted a base Custom Deluxe, mid-level Scottsdale, and flagship Silverado trim nomenclature for 1975.  GMC Suburbans were initially Custom, Super Custom, and Sierra Grande; in 1975, Sierra Classic replaced Super Custom.  In 1981, GMC replaced Custom with Sierra.  A rare variant for both Chevrolet and GMC was the Estate option package, offering woodgrain exterior trim (in line with sedan-based wagons); the option was offered through the 1979 model year.

Though technically fitted with only with a front bench seat as standard equipment, the Suburban was offered in multiple interior configurations, offering up to nine-passenger seating.  Bucket front seats became a front-seat option in 1978, with the third-row seat changed to a quick-release design (without tools) for 1979.  

The Rounded-Line Suburban shared the same exterior revisions of its pickup-truck counterpart.  Along with minor revisions in 1975, 1977, and 1980, the model line underwent a more substantial revision in 1981, followed by updates in 1983 and 1985.

Powertrain details 
The Suburban shared several engines with the C/K pickup truck line.  A 250 cubic-inch inline six was the standard engine through 1979.  The model line was offered with a 307 (1973 only) and 350 cubic-inch small-block V8s; a 454 cubic-inch big-block V8 was optional in C-series Suburbans.  For 1976, the 350 V8 was joined by 305 and 400 cubic-inch V8s; the latter was discontinued in 1980.  For 1980, V8 engines became standard for the model line, with the 305 returning as the standard engine for 1981.  For 1982, GM introduced a 6.2L Detroit Diesel V8 as an higher-efficiency alternative to the 7.4L V8.

A 3-speed manual transmission was offered through the 1980 model year, with a 4-speed manual offered through 1987.  Initially offered with 3-speed Turbo Hydra-Matic 350 and 400 automatic transmissions, a 4-speed Turbo Hydra-Matic 700R4 became an option in 1981.    

For 1980, K-series Suburbans moved from full-time four-wheel drive to a part-time system, allowing the front axle to freewheel.  For 1981, shift-on-the fly 4x4 drive adopted automatic-locking front hubs; the NP208 transfer case replaced the NP205 in most examples.

R/V series (1987-1991) 
For 1987, GM redesignated the Rounded-Line C/K series as the R/V series to accommodate the launch of the 1988 GMT800-platform C/K trucks, which were being launched in the spring of 1987.  For 1987, the gasoline engines of the model converted from carbureted fuel delivery to electronic fuel injection (using throttle body injection/TBI).  For 1988, the 5.0L engine was dropped from the line, with the 5.7L V8 becoming the standard engine.  In a trim revision, the R/V line adopted the nomenclature of its GMT800 successor, with all vehicles adopting the 1500/2500/3500 payload series (previously used by GMC) and the base Custom Deluxe trim retired and replaced by a revived Cheyenne trim.  

For 1989, the exterior underwent its largest revision since its 1973 introduction.  Adopting a style similar to the GMT800, the black-painted grille was offered with quad headlights (economy trims were equipped with two).  After using the same design nearly unchanged since 1973, the steering wheel was replaced (adopting the same design as the GMT800). 

For 1990, the Suburban introduced power-operated sideview mirrors, also adding the option of rear-wheel ABS.  Alongside the Suburban and Blazer/Jimmy, the R/V line was pared down nearly exclusively to 1-ton crew-cab pickup and chassis-cab trucks. 

For 1991, the 4-speed 700R4 automatic transmission was replaced by the electronically-controlled 4L80E unit.  After an 18-year production run, the Rounded-Line Suburban ended production as GM shifted crew-cab pickup truck and full-size SUVs to the GMT800 platform for 1992.

Eighth generation (1992) 

The GMT400-based Suburbans were introduced in December 1991 for the 1992 model year. The C/K pickup had already switched to the newer platform in 1987 for the 1988 model year. Both 2WD and 4WD models, designated "C" and "K", were offered, as well as half-ton and three-quarter-ton ("1500" and "2500") models.

The base engine for all variants was the small-block 5.7 liter V8. The big-block 7.4-liter V8 was optional for the 2500 series. The optional 6.5 L Turbo diesel was available on all models – though rare on the 1500 series. The 6.5-liter turbo diesel used in the Tahoe was detuned to  torque due to the limitation of the  axle capacity. 1500 Suburbans with the 6.5 L Turbo diesel used the 14 bolt axle from the 2500 series.

Transmissions included the 4L60 four-speed automatic in the 1500 series, and the heavier duty 4L80 four-speed automatic in the 2500 series and the 1500 series fitted with the 6.5-liter Turbo diesel. The manual transmission option from the previous generation was dropped.

The GMT400 series introduced independent front suspension. The 2WD models used coil springs and 4WD models used torsion bars in the front suspension. All models used a live axle and leaf springs in the rear.

The  time for a 1995 Suburban was 9.3 seconds. Top speed of a 1995 Suburban is governed on the engine for economy. A maximum of  can be obtained. In 1996, fuel economy had improved to  highway.

Trim options included a base-level version, the LS, and the LT. Interior seating arrangements allowed for either bucket or bench seating in the first row and optional third-row bench. The vehicle could be configured from two- to nine-passenger seating.

Beginning in 1994, GM began making numerous annual changes to the Suburban, including:
 Revised front clip and center stop lamp (1994)
 Revised interior including a driver-side air bag, revised side mirrors (1995)
 Revised Vortec L31 and Vortec 7400 engines with increased power and fuel efficiency, electronic 4WD shifting, daytime running lights, illuminated entry, and some new interior features (1996)
 Revised transmissions, improved steering system, and added passenger-side airbag (1997)
 OnStar, PassLock security system and full-time AutoTrac 4WD option added, next generation "depowered" air bags, revised steering wheel, transmissions revised again (1998)
 No major changes upon introduction of redesigned 2000 models (1999)

Holden Suburban 
In Australia and New Zealand, Holden imported the right-hand drive Chevrolet Suburban built by GM in Silao, Mexico, between February 1998 and January 2001. The Suburban was first previewed in October 1997 at the Sydney Motor Show. In total, 746 were sold (460 petrol and 286 diesel). After 2001, subsequent models reverted to the original Chevrolet brand, which had also been used before 1998. Over the model's lifetime there were three trim levels: a base model, the LS and the LT. Not to be confused with the trim variants is the model code, designated K8.

The Holden's interior differed from that of the American version, as the right-hand drive dashboard of the Blazer was used instead. However, it had to be stretched on the passenger (left) side to fit in the larger Suburban. A bench seat came standard on the entry-level variant as well as the LS, but the more expensive LT received bucket seats. With the omission of the center seat, the LT has a maximum seating capacity of eight, compared to nine.

Creature comforts standard in all models included a LCD compass in the rear-view mirror, a tilt adjustable steering wheel, a driver's airbag, ABS brakes, and dual-zone air conditioning. The second tier LS brought alloy wheels, power windows and mirrors among some features. To further up the ante, the LT gained electric front seats, leather trim, and a horizontally slated, two-part tailgate. This came as opposed to the "barn doors" found on the other specifications.

The former choice was designated the "1500" name, while the turbodiesel saw the "2500" identify. The 5.7-liter petrol engine is LPG-compatible, and such systems can be retrofitted if desired. Regardless of the engine specified, the truck was equipped with a four-speed automatic transmission. However, what differed was the type of transmission. Petrol motors were fitted with the GM 4L60-E transmission, with the GM 4L80-E reserved for the diesel. A dashboard switch allows the vehicle to power all four wheels simultaneously, or the rear wheels only, and allows the low range gearing to be engaged.

With the hefty fuel consumption comes a  fuel tank.

To combat the extra payload and towing capacity of the diesel, an improved braking package, as well as super heavy duty axles and suspension were fitted.

The Holden Suburban's run wasn't the first or only time that Holden had sold the GMT400 platform in Oceania.  Beginning in 1996, they imported GMC C/Ks for ambulance conversions. Unlike the Suburbans, these vehicles were not available to the general public, nor did they bear Holden badging. They also were not built as right-hand-drives from the factory like the Suburban was; the same company that handled the ambulance conversion (Jakab Ambulance in Tamworth) also switched the steering to the other side.

Ninth generation (2000) 

The GMT800-based Suburbans were introduced in late December 1999 (Texas-only) and January 2000 (nationally) for the 2000 model year. They were sold in two series: 1/2-ton 1500 and 3/4-ton 2500. Suburbans came in Base, LS, and LT trims. Optional was a pushbutton 4WD with a low-range transfer case. A tow hitch with a trailer wiring plug was optional.

For 2000, Chevrolet's long-serving 5.7 L and 7.4-liter V8 engines were retired along with the 6.5-liter diesel. New engines were Vortec 5300  for the 1500 series and Vortec 6000  for the 2500 series.

Where Chevrolet kept the Tahoe/Suburban branding, GMC renamed their GMT800 products Yukon and Yukon XL, a change that continues to the present day. The shorter 116" wheelbase became the Yukon and the full-length 130" wheelbase became the Yukon XL. Yukons were delivered in SLE, SLT and Denali finish packages.

New features included:
 A spare tire relocated beneath the vehicle (instead of in the cargo area as on previous models)
 "Puddle lamps" in the exterior mirrors on LS and LT models
 New instrument panel including a driver message center and engine hour meter
 Electronic climate control available on LT models
 Four-wheel disc brakes
 Load-leveling Autoride suspension available on LT models
 Premium Ride rear self-leveling suspension available on LS models
 Digital Components 
 new wheels 
 new interior
 new modern dashboard
 taillights with separate amber-colored turn signal indicators (thus this generation only)

For 2001, the 6.0-liter V8 in 2500-series Suburbans gained  from a number of changes including aluminum cylinder heads. The new Vortec 8100  V8 was added as an option for the 2500 as well. OnStar became standard on LT models and LS models with the new Z71 package. Quadrasteer four-wheel steering was added as an option on 2500 models only.

2002 saw several optional features made standard equipment on the LS model, including front and rear air conditioning, alloy wheels, power windows, power front seats, side steps, fog lamps, and heated outside rearview mirrors. Base models were discontinued, leaving LS and LT.

The Vortec 5300 L59 variant in the 1500 series added flex-fuel capability. The 6.0-liter engine was not available in the 1500 series.

For 2003, all GM full-size trucks received an upgraded interior, with better-quality materials and other enhancements. New radios offered Radio Data System compatibility, XM satellite radio, Bose sound and improved ergonomics. Adjustable pedals were added as an option, and the instrument cluster-mounted Driver Information Center was improved and monitored up to 34 vehicle functions. A Panasonic DVD system was added as an option.
GM's Stabilitrak system was added, and Quadrasteer became available on 2500 series Suburbans.

For 2004, 1500-series Suburbans received the Hydroboost braking system that was previously introduced in the 2500 series.

The Mexican-market Suburban received a front end update this year, matching that of the Silverado.

The 2005 model year saw the long-standard side-hinged panel doors discontinued in favor of the formerly optional liftgate. All engines switched to an all-electric cooling system to reduce power loss and fuel consumption.

The Z71 package, long exclusive to 4WD models, became available on 2WD Suburbans. OnStar also became standard across the board.

Finally, Stabilitrak became standard on all models shortly after the start of the model year.

the 2005 Suburban 1500 won the J.D. Power and Associates award for highest initial quality among large SUVs, beating out its rivals the Ford Expedition and Toyota Sequoia.

For 2006, the GMT800 Suburban's last year, a special LTZ trim package became available, featuring  wheels, all-wheel drive, and the LQ4 6.0 L engine of the 2500 series of trucks and SUVs.

The catalytic converters were relocated closer to the engine. The XM radio antenna and the OnStar antenna were combined into a single unit.

Engines 
 Vortec 5700  V8 remained in use in 2002-00 Suburbans, Tahoes (called Sonora) as well as Silverado pickup trucks in the Mexican market

Tenth generation (2007) 

The 2007 model year Suburban and Yukon XL were unveiled at the 2006 Los Angeles Auto Show in January. Production of the redesigned GMT900 Suburban and Yukon XL began at Janesville Assembly and Silao Assembly in January 2006 (Suburban) April 2006 (Yukon XL), with the vehicles arriving at dealerships in April.

The new models were redesigned with more modern, less boxy styling, already seen on the previously released 2007 Tahoes and Yukons. The exterior features a more aerodynamic shape, made partly by a steeply raked windshield angle.

The interior has a redesigned dashboard and improved seats. It still retains its 9-passenger seating availability, which is available on LS and SLE models only. LT2 and LT3 models have leather seating and available 6-, 7-, and 8-passenger seating. A Z71 package was available on LT2 and LT3 models which includes two-tone leather seats. All Mexican-built Suburbans including the 9-seat models offer the special two-tone leather seating used by the Z71. The Suburban LTZ comes standard with a DVD player and a GPS navigation enhanced touchscreen radio.

For the 2010 model year, in which U.S. News & World Report ranked it as the number one affordable large SUV, the Suburban added a premium interior package that includes tri-zone climate control and handy features like Bluetooth and rear audio controls. Additionally, radios that are standard in all 2010 trims got a USB port, allowing for music to be played from auxiliary devices through the radio, as well as charging other small electronics. Side blind zone alert became an option on LT and standard on LTZ. The 6.0-liter engine in the 2010 models will also be flex-fuel capable. Minor front end changes including a slightly raised front bumper and side torso airbags were also made standard for 2010.

In February 2010, Chevrolet unveiled a 75th-anniversary edition of the Suburban, which had the LTZ trim with white diamond tricoat exterior paint and cashmere interior, along with standard 20-inch chrome-clad wheels, revised roof rails, integrated navigation radio, XM Satellite Radio, Bluetooth phone connectivity, rearview camera, rear park assist, remote starting, adjustable pedals, and leather upholstery with heated/cooled front seats. Chevrolet says that the anniversary edition will be limited to 2,570 units because of the amount of white diamond paint GM can procure.

The 5.3-liter and 6.0-liter engines carried over, and a new  6.2-liter Vortec V8 was added for the Yukon XL Denali. The 8.1-liter engine was dropped.

For the 2011 model year, the Suburban will add three new exterior colors to the lineup: Mocha Steel Metallic, Green Steel Metallic, and Ice Blue Metallic. The trims will also get an updated modification, with the rear audio system, Bluetooth, floor console/storage area, woodgrain interior, luggage rack rails, body-color exterior door handle/mirror caps, and premium-cloth front bucket seats now standard on the 1LS trim, and chrome recovery hooks, two-speed transfer case, and 20-inch chrome wheels standard on its 1LZ 4WD models. In addition, the trailering package will feature the trailer brake controller as a standard on all trims.

For the 2012 model year, trailer sway control and Hill Start Assist become standard on all trims, while the LTZ trim added a heated steering wheel as standard. Also, the LT1/2 options for the Suburban and SLE1/2 and SLT1/2 options on the Yukon XL were discontinued, leaving the Suburban with only an LS, LT, and LTZ trim and the Yukon XL with an SLE and SLT trim. In 2012, GMC celebrated its 100th anniversary by releasing a special edition of its Yukon XL, offering a Heritage Edition trim package. This was the final year that three colors, Graystone Metallic, Gold Mist Metallic, and Blue Topaz Metallic, would be offered, along with the all-season blackwall P265/65R18 tires.

For the 2013 model year, two new colors were offered: Champagne Silver Metallic and Blue Ray Metallic (extra charge). Also new is Powertrain Grade Braking, normal mode. The 2013 model arrived at Chevrolet dealers in June 2012.

For the 2014 model year, power-adjustable pedals, remote vehicle starter system, and rear parking assist along with rear vision camera and inside mirror with camera display became standard on the Suburban LS trims.  Concord Metallic (which was supposed to be available for the 2013 MY) was added to the Suburban color offerings for the 2014 models. For the Yukon XL, a convenience package became standard on its SLE models, along with a new color, Deep Indigo Metallic. In February 2014, The Suburban came in second behind the Tahoe among the top-ranked large affordable SUVs by U.S News & World Report. This would be followed by being acknowledged as an award recipient in the large SUV category by JD Power and Associates in July 2014.

The towing capacity of the Suburban 2500 was unmatched, but also uncontested due to the discontinuation of the Ford Excursion in 2006.

The 2500 Suburban was originally sourced from Silao, Mexico from 2007 to 2008 but was moved to the Arlington, Texas assembly plant for the 2009 model year, where production of all GM fullsize SUVs was consolidated after the closing of the Janesville plant.

GM discontinued the 2500 3/4 Ton versions of both Suburban and Yukon XL models after the 2013 model year.

Eleventh generation (2015)

The eleventh generation Chevrolet Suburban, GMC Yukon XL, and Yukon Denali XL were introduced to the public on September 12, 2013, and GM unveiled the vehicles in different locations (The Suburban in New York, Yukon XL in Los Angeles) on that date. Both vehicles are based on the GMT K2XX platform and carried unique serial designated numbers, identified by platform (K2), brand (YC for Chevrolet, YG for GMC), drivetrain (C for 2WD; K for 4WD), tonnage (15 for half-ton, 25 for 3/4-ton, 35 for 1-ton), wheelbase (7 for short, 9 for long), and 06 for SUV, which means that a K2YC-K-15-9-06 would be identified as a Chevrolet Suburban 1500 4WD. The Suburban and Yukon XL went on sale in February 2014 as a 2015 model, with the vehicles built exclusively in Arlington, Texas.

Production details
The newly redesigned Suburban and Yukon XL were showcased to the public for the first time on September 27, 2013, at the State Fair of Texas. This move comes on the heels of the 80th anniversary of the first production of the Suburban in 1934.

The designs and concepts were created by GM's exterior design manager Chip Thole (before his transfer to GM's Buick design studio in 2013), who told Truck Trend "I start with what intuition tells me about the market and get the team going on that. You look at trends around the industry – fashion, culture, what people are buying, what they say they want now – and project that into the future. The fun part is putting those ideas to paper and going from there." He then added, "We wanted to take what was good about today's vehicles, bring that forward and make them new and different with that spark of freshness that people recognize, without making them gimmicky or overdone." Thole also challenged his design team to help bring ideas to the SUVs, which lead to the split headlamps and a more graphic feel for the Suburban design, while a more industrial but sculptured look was added to the Yukon XL to give it a unique identity of its own.

Production on the Suburban and Tahoe began in December 2013 with the first completed SUVs being used for testing purposes. GM then officially started shipping the vehicles to dealerships on February 5, 2014. It is estimated that it takes 8–10 weeks to assemble the SUVs, save for the upgrades on the level trims and destination scheduling.

Features
The front fascias of the Chevy Suburban and GMC Yukon XL are distinct, but from the base of the A-pillars back, they share most of the same styling cues. This now includes inlaid doors that tuck into the door sills, instead of over them, improving aerodynamics, fuel economy, and lessens interior noise. The hoods and liftgate panels are made of aluminum to reduce vehicle weight, and the wiper blades that were located on the liftgate door were moved to the rear spoiler located on the top of the rear liftgate window.

The increased fuel economy also vaulted the Suburban/Yukon XL into the top spot among large SUVs with the most efficient fuel economy rating numbers for this segment. However, when Motor Trend (which placed the 2015 Suburban on the front cover of its June 2014 issue) did a road test review on the SUVs, it estimated the 4WD MPG on the Suburban LTZ to be slightly better at around  city and  highway, while the 4WD Yukon Denali XL, whose fuel economy (MPG) is rated at  city and  highway, was estimated lower at  city and  highway.

Like the 2007–14 version, both the Suburban and Yukon XL do not share a single piece of sheet metal or lighting element with the brands' full-size pick-up trucks (GMC Sierra and Chevy Silverado), and the front grilles of both vehicles are slightly altered to give it their own identity. The front headlights feature projector-beam headlamps that flank the Chevrolet-signature dual-port grille – chrome on all models, sweeping into the front fenders, while the Tahoe, Suburban LTZ, Yukon, and Yukon XL Denali trims feature projector-beam high-intensity discharge headlamps and light-emitting diode daytime running lamps. The Yukon and Yukon XL also feature projector-beam halogen headlamps on all SLE and SLT trims. The improved safety features included a 360-degree radar detection for crash avoidance and occupant protection and a high-tech anti-theft system that now includes vertical and interior sensors, in-glass and window breaking, a triggering alarm, and a shutdown device that prevents the vehicle from moving. The latter is expected to address the issues regarding the constant thefts of the vehicles, especially with the previous generation's removable seats and items left in the cargo space, which has become a target for carjackers who see the third-row seats as valuable on the black market. According to General Motors' head of Global Vehicle Security Bill Biondo, "We have engineered a layered approach to vehicle security," adding that "With new standard features and the available theft protection package, we are making the vehicles less attractive target to thieves and more secure for our customers."

Also new are the addition of fold-flat second and third-row seats (replacing the aforementioned removable third seats), which is now a standard feature but can be equipped with an optional power-folding feature for the upgraded trims, and an additional two inches of legroom for second-row passengers. HD radio became a standard feature on all trims. Multiple USB ports and power outlets are now spread throughout their interiors, including one 120V three-prong outlet on both Suburban and Yukon XL, with the Suburban adding an available eight-inch color touch screen radio with next-generation MyLink connectivity along with an available rear-seat entertainment system with dual screens and Blu-ray DVD player, while the Yukon XL adds a standard eight-inch-diagonal color touch screen radio with enhanced IntelliLink and available navigation. A 4G LTE WiFi access system, along with Siri Eyes Free and text messaging alerts, was included in all vehicles that feature the OnStar device around the second quarter of 2014.

2015 mid-year update
The Suburban added a hands-free power liftgate feature that is standard on the LTZ but included on the LT with the optional Luxury Package. The added 4G LTE WiFi and Siri features became standard on both LT and LTZ trims, while the MyLink with Navigation feature was upgraded from optional to standard on the LTZ trim. The E85 capability feature is removed from retail orders.

The Yukon XL's 6.2-liter EcoTec3 V8 engine was updated with the new 8L90E eight-speed automatic transmission for the interim model year, allowing it to improve fuel economy. The Yukon XL Denali, however, saw its MSRP bumped up by $1,300 in part due to the loaded features.

All GM Full-sized SUVs received a body-colored painted Shark Fin antenna as part of the 2015 mid-year refresh.

This refresh is often referred to as the 2015i, "i" for interim processing code.

2016
For the 2016 model year (which commenced sales in July 2015), the Chevrolet Suburban received more upgraded changes and new features that included power-adjustable pedals, forward collision alert, IntelliBeam headlamps, lane keep assist, and a safety alert seat as part of the newly introduced enhanced driver alert package as an available option on the LS trim. The inside floor console with storage area-SD card reader was removed, while a new AM/FM audio integrated system with Sirius XM, HD Radio, and CD/MP3 capabilities was introduced as a standard feature on all trims; the 8-inch MyLink feature was expanded to the LS trim and became standard (replacing the 4-inch display), although the navigation feature remains as an option on LT and standard on LTZ. A new liftgate shield was added to the Theft Protection Package, along with the new lane keep assist which replaced the lane departure warning. The capless fuel fill tanks became standard on all trims. Siren Red Tintcoat and Iridescent Pearl Tricoat became the new color trims, replacing Crystal Red Tintcoat and White Diamond Tricoat. The instrument cluster was re-configured with a new multi-color enhancement and a heads-up display was introduced as a standard only on the LTZ trim. The 2016 models also saw a price hike as well.

The 2016 GMC Yukon XL also sees similar changes, with the new enhanced driver alert package as an available option on the SLE trim, liftgate, power, hands-free now packaged on SLT trims, a free-flow feature that replaced the Premium package, a lane keep assist added to all trims, and two new premium colors (Crimson Red Tintcoat and White Frost Tricoat) replacing Crystal Red Tintcoat and White Diamond Tricoat respectively.

Chevrolet added Apple CarPlay and Android Auto Capability features to the Suburban starting with the 2016 models. However, only one of their phone brands at any one time can be used, while the Android Auto option will only be available on LT and LTZ trims featuring 8-inch screens.

GM expanded newer 4G LTE features (like detecting battery failure and monitoring insurance discounts based on driver performance) to 2016 model year vehicles, including the Suburban, which GM cited as being the vehicle that is the most used among data subscribers.

2017 
The 2017 model year Chevrolet Suburban received upgraded changes after it went on sale in August 2016. The level trims LS and LT are retained but the LTZ is renamed Premier, the latter serving as the equivalent to the Yukon XL Denali. The LS trims also saw the badged "LS" lettering removed. The new features include two new colors (Blue Velvet Metallic and Pepperdust Metallic), two new 22-inch wheel options (a 7-spoke Silver wheels with Chrome inserts for all trims; Ultra Bright machined aluminum wheels with Bright Silver finish for Premier trim only), black roof rack cross rails (as part of the Texas Edition Package and All-Season Package), front active aero shutters (all trims), and heated and vented seats (Premier trim only). The MyLink was updated to incorporate Teen Driver, App Shop, Rear Seat Reminder customization, and Low-Speed Forward Automatic Braking (as part of Enhanced Driver Alert Package on the LS trim, but standard on LT and Premier). The Rear Seat Entertainment System was overhauled to include a new video voiceover feature for the visually and hearing impaired, an HDMI/MHL connector, digital headphones, Digital Living Network Alliance (DLNA) technology incorporated into the Wi-Fi system, and a second USB port with the capability of charging up to a 2.1-amp at the back of the console.

The 2017 model year Yukon XL also received similar changes, but with a few exceptions. Two new colors, Dark Blue Sapphire Metallic and Mineral Metallic were introduced, the latter exclusive to the Denali, which also added a new 22-inch ultra-bright aluminum wheels with midnight silver premium paint and a head-up display to its features. The interior backlights changed from red to blue. The heated and vented driver and front passenger seats are now standard on the SLT and Denali trims.

2018 
The 2018 model year Suburban had a few upgrades and deletions. LED daytime running lights became standard on all trims, along with a new color, Havana Metallic and Satin Steel Metallic. The Cocoa/Mahogany interior that was combined with the Pepperdust Metallic exterior was dropped along with the wireless/inductive phone charging that was part of the Luxury and Texas Edition LT level trims. The fleet/commercial level trim, which had fewer features, is upgraded to include MyLink, HD Radio, multi-color driver information center, LED daytime running lights, and an optional driver alert package.

The 2018 Yukon Denali XL received a new grille with a layered appearance like the ones on its redesigned 2018 Acadia and Terrain brands, featuring high-intensity-discharge headlights and LED daytime running lights. The refreshed design provides better airflow to the radiator, and when less cooling air is needed, shutters behind the grille close to improve aerodynamics and increase efficiency. The interior featured new ash wood trim that GMC says gives the cabin a richer appearance. A new 10-speed automatic transmission was mated to its , 6.2-liter V8 engine, replacing the 8-speed transmission.

2019 
The 2019 Suburban will have both Havana Metallic and Tungsten Metallic deleted in favor of a new Shadow Gray Metallic exterior color, while the top-of-the-line Premier will now have the name displayed on the tailgate. The LS trim continues to make HD Radio a standard feature, but can be deleted if customers opt for the OnStar feature.

The 2019 model year GMC Yukon XL adds three new exterior colors, Dark Sky Metallic, Pepperdust Metallic, and Smokey Quartz Metallic, while deleting two others, Mineral Metallic and Iridium Metallic. GMC also introduces two new package features, Graphite Edition and Graphite Performance Edition, which will be available in the SLT level trim only

2020 
The 2020 Chevrolet Suburban dropped the LT Signature Package and the LS All-Season Package, along with the Pepperdust Metallic color, while the 2020 GMC Yukon XL replaced its Pepperdust Metallic color with Carbon Black Metallic and made no additional changes.

Accolades
The 2015 Suburban was ranked third among the top affordable SUVs and fifth among affordable SUVs with 3-row seats by U.S. News & World Report, and was among the finalists in Motor Trend's SUV of the year for 2015. It also received a 2015 MotorWeek Drivers' Choice Award for best large SUV, while Consumer Reports ranked the Suburban as the best SUV with a third row seat, topping its competitors in this category.

The Chevrolet Suburban took third place behind the Tahoe and GMC Yukon in the 2016 J.D. Power Vehicle Dependability Study among full-size SUVs, based on responses from owners of the vehicles.

Good Housekeeping named the 2018 Suburban the "Best New Car of Year 2018" in the Large SUV category. In its review of the vehicle from GH and its reason for the decision to award the SUV: "Whether you're bringing the whole soccer team home or moving kids into college, it's a larger-than-life workhorse that can handle your crew and all their stuff."

Consumer Reports added the 2018 Suburban to their recommended list due to high owner satisfaction scores.

The Suburban was given a Hollywood Walk of Fame star on December 5, 2019, one of two inanimate objects to be awarded such (Disneyland being the other), for its frequent appearances in film and television. Because city regulations prohibit placing corporate names on public sidewalks including the Walk of Fame, the star was instead placed in an area adjacent to the Walk of Fame.

Sales
The eleventh generation Suburban saw an increase in sales; April 2014 brought a 109.8 percent spike, with most dealers reporting that the vehicles are being sold within 10 days after arriving on the lot, with customers opting for the fully loaded LTZ model, making it one of Chevrolet's fastest selling brands in 2014. The eleventh generation Suburban is also a hot seller in the Middle East, where in August 2014 posted a 37% increase in sales, with most of the purchases coming from Saudi Arabia (65%), the United Arab Emirates (15%) and Qatar (108%). By the end of September 2014, GM sold more than 4101 units of the Suburban (up 50.1%), while the Yukon XL posted 2165 units sold (up 64%), with GM boasting that 80% of the vehicles sold were its large SUVs.

In Canada, sales of the Suburban reached 966 units (up 43%) in 2014, although the Yukon XL is the best seller in that country with 1,760 vehicles sold (up 50.3%) that same year. Overall, they account for 70 percent of GM Canada's SUV sales for 2014.

On August 17, 2015, GM confirmed plans to increase production on its large SUVs, especially on the Suburban/Yukon XL, due to lower gas prices and a higher demand for the vehicles. The move also resulted in its Arlington Assembly adding more hours and increasing its production from 48,000 SUVs to 60,000 based on the expanding hours and added Saturday overtime shifts.

The 2017 MY Suburban saw its biggest sales increase in January 2017, when it posted a 72.3% gain (5,634 units), the most ever since January 2008 when it had the 2008 MY Suburban.

Twelfth generation (2021)

On December 10, 2019, Chevrolet introduced the twelfth generation Suburban at Little Caesars Arena in Detroit, Michigan. This time around, GM chose to introduce the Chevrolet full-size SUVs first. The GMC Yukon XL was later introduced on January 14, 2020. Although the full size fifth generation Cadillac Escalade made its debut on February 4, 2020, its extended length sibling Escalade ESV was the last GM full size SUV to be introduced online in April 2020 after it was withdrawn from the canceled 2020 New York International Auto Show. Originally scheduled to start in April 2020, GM began production on the Suburban on May 18, 2020. They began entering dealerships in June 2020.

Chevrolet Suburban

2021

Based on the same GMT T1XX platform as the Silverado 1500, the Suburban distinguished itself by swapping that truck's live axle and leaf springs for an independent rear multilink suspension setup with coil springs, thus lowering the floor of the vehicle and creating more room, in both the cargo area and the second- and third-row seats. The towing capabilities were increased with the twelfth generation models.

The trims feature the primary basic LS, LT, and Premier levels, with the 4WD-exclusive Z71 and RST moving from package to premium levels, along with the newly added High Country level, the latter being the top of the line. Chevrolet rolled out the LT, Z71, Premier, and High Country levels first, with the LS and RST levels arriving in late Fall 2020.

Quad exhaust tailpipes are added to the vehicle, giving it a more unique look, although this feature is only standard on Premier and High Country. This feature isn't offered on the LS, LT, Z71 and RST because of their configuration as regular base, off-road, and street-centric level trims respectively, nor on all trims with a Duramax option. The RST Suburban, which had photos released in April 2020, has a unique fascia and a sportier design similar to its Cadillac Escalade ESV Sport level trim. Both Premier and High Country trims have power-retractable assist steps that was optional on the Premier trim from the previous generation.

Although it retained a boxy look, it added a more curvaceous design with this change and adopted the same Chevrolet design language featuring the front grille and distinct LED lighting that is also used on the Silverado, save for the black-grilled Z71 (without the bumper) and RST. The tailgate is more front and center, with the signature "Suburban" name stretched across it. A combination of sheet metal and aluminum was used to ensure a more lightweight vehicle.
 
The dashboard and entertainment system have been fleshed out, moving away from the traditional design. Newly updated features include a 10.25-inch touch screen that is now standard on all trims, and a pair of 12.6-inch LCD rear screens that can play movies and offer content from passengers' smartphones and can play different programs on the two screens. A new push-button shifter column (P, R, N, D) is placed on the dashboard. Nine camera displays for enhanced towing capabilities and a total of 30 additional safety features have been implemented throughout the Suburban. An Air Ride Adaptive Suspension is standard on the higher trims, likewise with an 8-inch driver screen. Another new feature, a power sliding console that became available in late Summer 2020. The High Country Suburban also has a Deluxe package option with advance features that is exclusive to this trim only. The 40/20/40 front seat option that was available on the LS trim is now exclusive to fleet orders with this generation using the same base trim.

The 6.2-liter EcoTec engine that was reserved for the RST trim in the previous generation is exclusive to the High Country level trim. The engine choices added up to improved fuel economy numbers, albeit with an increased MPG for city and a decreased MPG for highway. GM has no plans to offer this model in a 2500 or 3500 series version.

2022
For the 2022 model year, the Suburban will see an increased availability of the 6.2-liter V-8, which continues to be standard on High Country but can now be fitted to the RST, Z71, and Premier trim levels, and expands the Magnetic Ride Control damping system to the RST. The 12.3-inch screen (with Google Assistant, Google Maps and the Google Play Store embedded) becomes standard on the higher trims except for the LS. A newly optional electronic limited-slip differential will be available on the Z71 trim and can be used in the 4WD Low setting.

Yukon XL

2021
GMC unveiled its twelfth generation Yukon XL in Vail, Colorado on January 14, 2020, alongside its full-size sibling Yukon. Like the Suburban, the Yukon XL also featured an independent rear suspension, a 3.0-liter inline-six turbodiesel engine, and a top-shelf suspension option featuring air springs and magnetic-ride shocks, a standard 5.3-liter V-8, an optional  6.2-liter V-8, and a 10-speed automatic transmission that is standard across the lineup. It also gained  in the wheelbase but only  in overall length, making it still short of the Suburban's length. The dashboard have two versions, one similar to the Suburban while a different one with a larger entertainment screen is exclusive to the Denali. The Yukon XL's design follows GMC's design language, with the front grille mimicking the Sierra but the tailgate mimicking the GMC crossover SUV lineup with the lights extended to the tailgate doors.

The lineup of level trims also expanded as well, with the SLE, SLT, and Denali now joined by the 4WD-exclusive AT4, the latter of which comes standard with the Magnetic Ride Control electronically adaptive dampers, AT4-exclusive leather-appointed seats, and stitching with a unique Jet Black interior color and Brandy accents, a heated steering wheel, heated and ventilated front seats, heated second-row outboard seats, a two-speed transfer case, 20-inch Goodyear all-terrain tires, Traction Select System with off-road mode, hill descent control, and skid plates. The Denali level offers three packages for this generation, with Deluxe joining the Premium and Ultimate options, and became the only trim to offer quad exhaust tailpipes.

2022
For the 2022 model year, the Yukon XL added a few additions similar to the Suburban, among them a 12.3-inch digital gauge cluster that is now standard on all trims, with Google Assistant, Google Maps and the Google Play Store embedded. The power sliding center console is now standard on the Denali trim. Redwood Metallic is added as a new color option.

Availability
For international regions, Chevrolet started selling the twelfth generation Suburban in Mexico in August 2020, but unlike the United States and Canada, Mexico only offered the Suburban in the LT, RST, and High Country trims; the LS, Z71, and Premier level trims and the Duramax option are not offered for that country. The American-built models will use the GM 10-speed automatic transmission with Electronic Precision Shift technology, manufactured at the GM Silao Complex in the state of Guanajuato in central Mexico. The Philippines began selling the 2021–present Suburban (with a possibility that it would offer a Duramax engine option in the country should Chevrolet make it available) in Fall 2020, followed by the Middle East region. In November 2020, GM announced that their large SUV lineup would be imported to China, marking the Suburban's maiden entry into the country, starting with the 12th generation models. However, GM later cancelled those plans in February 2021, citing the difficulty of having an import being sold alongside its Chinese-built offerings, the makeup of the facilities that would be required to assemble the full-size SUVs, and concerns that the full-size SUVs won't be able to comply with the stringent emission standards imposed by the Government of China.

A right-hand-drive version of Suburban for Australia and right-hand-drive markets to be done by Holden Special Vehicles, which was announced in December 2019, is on hold, citing the low demand, capacity issues at HSV, and highly competitive large luxury SUV and towing market in Australia, although that could change due to GM's partnership with HSV to bring more American vehicles like the Suburban back down under the newly announced GMSV arrangement.

The Yukon XL officially went on sale for the first time ever in Mexico, starting in the Fall of 2020 with the 2021 models (GMC had only offered the Yukon in that country due to GM not wanting to have the Yukon XL cannibalized in terms of sales with the Suburban, which is also that country's best selling SUV), where it is only available in the Denali trim.

Signature Editions
Beginning with the 2018 model year, Chevrolet offered a "Signature Edition" package/trims of the Suburban. Each of the specialty versions were available at the LT and Premier level trims. Both the Z71 and RST became the fourth and fifth level trims starting with the twelfth generation Suburban for the 2021 model year, while the remaining continues as package features.

Z71 and Texas Edition
On September 26, 2014, Chevrolet debuted the updated Z71 Suburban at the State Fair of Texas, along with the debut of the Texas Edition Suburban, the latter due to Texas having the most units of Suburbans sold in the United States (As of August 2014, sales of the Chevrolet SUVs in Texas were up 37 percent) and to celebrate the 60th anniversary of GM's Arlington Assembly plant; production of the Z71 Suburban began in October 2014.

As with the previous Z71 Suburbans, this version continued to be offered in a 4WD LT trim only, featuring a front skid plate, off-road tires mounted on 18-inch wheels, a unique grille, running boards, and "Z71" identification inside and out. Fog lamps, front tow hooks, and front parking assist are also included. The 2016 Z71 package was modified again, as portions of the Z71 items added on the Texas Edition package as an optional feature by request from customers was discontinued, making it a stand-alone package. The Z71 package was upgraded to a level trim starting with the twelfth generation models.

The Texas Edition Suburban, which became part of the Texas Edition lineup along with the Tahoe and Silverado, was available in both LT and LTZ trims for the 2015 model year, featuring a maximum trailering package, twenty-inch polished aluminum wheels (on LT models), twenty-two-inch premium painted aluminum wheels (on LTZ models), and an exclusive "Texas Edition" badge. For the 2016 model year, Chevrolet discontinued the LTZ package but modified for the LT package without the requested Z71 features. The Twelfth generation Suburban will continue to offer the Texas Edition for the LT and Premier trims only when combined with the Luxury, LT Signature, and Premium packages.

LT Signature Edition
The Suburban LT Signature Edition, introduced in the 2018 model year, was an optional package trim, similar to the luxury package but with less expensive features, available in the LT level trim only. This option was discontinued after the 2019 model year but will be offered for the 2021 model year.

Midnight Edition
A Midnight Edition Suburban, an all-black optional package available in 4WD LT and Z71 versions, was introduced for the 2017 model year. This version became part of the Signature Edition Suburban feature for the 2018 model year up until the 2020 model year.

Premier Plus
On August 13, 2018, Chevrolet introduced a more upgraded version of the top-of-the-line Premier level trim of the Suburban, packaged as the Premier Plus, featuring a 6.2-liter engine, the classic gold bowtie emblems, chrome nameplate badging, and new polished 22-inch wheels. The interior is unique to these models, boasting with heated/ventilated Black-and-Mahogany leather front seats, Jet Black trim surround, a head-up display, and an eight-inch cluster. The exterior features standard cross rails, chrome power steps, and chrome exhaust tips. This feature was discontinued in the 2020 model year.

RST Edition
Chevrolet added a new package to the 2018 model year Suburban with the introduction of the street-themed RST (Rally Sport Truck) Special Edition Suburban. The press release also detailed additional features; The chrome elements are absent as body-color grilles surround the door and handles, along with an added gloss-black grille and mirror caps, black roof rails, window trim, badging and Chevy bowties, an exclusive 22-inch wheels wrapped in Bridgestone P285/45R 22 tires, a Borla performance exhaust system, massive front red Brembo six-piston, fixed aluminum calipers with brake pads clamping on larger-than-stock  Duralife rotors, coupled with an 84 percent increase in brake pad area and a 42 percent increase in rotor area to increase system thermal capacity.

However, after the press release Chevrolet confirmed that the RST Suburban would only be available as an appearance package, as the 6.2-liter engine would not be used for the 2018 model year. But on May 4, 2018, Chevrolet expanded the RST package to the Suburban as an option for the 2019 model year that will now include the 10-speed automatic transmission and 6.2L engine, reversing a decision made by GM that it would be exclusive to GMC and Cadillac's Suburban siblings Yukon XL and Escalade ESV. The packaged trim went on sale in July 2018. The RST package option became a level trim with the twelfth generation Suburban for the 2021 model year.

2500HD and 3500HD Suburban

A 2500HD Suburban became available in 2015 as a 2016 model. The 2500HD Suburban is only offered in LS and LT trims, reserving the LTZ trim for a more luxurious offering (like limousine or taxi-related services). There is no 2WD or upgraded packages. In addition, there are no plans to offer a 3/4-ton GMC Yukon XL as GM is making the design exclusive to Chevrolet for the time being.

A one-ton "Suburban 3500HD," which would be a GM-unique SUV, was introduced for the 2016 model year. Although the vehicle has a high GVWR, it is configured to provide a minimal towing capacity and is primarily intended for conversion to an armored vehicle. This version does not include HD radio, nor is there a GMC Yukon XL equivalent, making this version exclusive to Chevrolet as well.

The 2020 model year would be the last year for these two features, as GM has decided not to carry them over to the twelfth generation models for the time being.

Additional changes

Upgrades
There was no diesel variant of the full-size SUVs for the 2015-2020 model year versions. GM offered another off-road variant or trim for the Suburban and Yukon XL starting with the eleventh generation. With the relaunch of the Z71 package in the Suburban for the 2015-2020 models, GM filed papers to trademark the Trail Boss name for use on future Chevrolet truck and SUV models, although they were never used for the Suburban trims.

Concept versions
On November 4, 2013, Chevrolet unveiled a concept design for the Suburban called the Half-Pipe, whose features include roof racks and crossbars to mount skis, at the SEMA Show. Afterwards, Chevrolet made its parts available for order at Chevrolet Accessories.

At the 2017 SEMA Show, a 4x4 off-road Suburban concept inspired by Country singer (and Chevrolet spokesman) Luke Bryan based around his 2016 song "Huntin', Fishin' and Lovin' Every Day" was introduced, decked out in custom Hunter Bronze exterior color with Dark Carbon accents and camo graphics, a roof-mounted light rack and a custom lower fascia, a liftgate re-engineered to swing outward rather than upward and incorporates a custom spare tire mount, 22-inch wheels with 35-inch-tall tires, roof-mounted equipment carrier with a fishing rod holder, an interior design consisting of Black and Two-Tone Olive with Argon Orange, unique seating featuring Argon piping and Platinum camo-pattern perforated designs, and the "Huntin', Fishin' and Lovin' Every Day" badges (designated by symbols in lieu of the words) displayed on both the exterior and interior. The rear windows are removed. The concept was inspired by Bryan himself and collaborated with Chevrolet on this project as he is an owner of a Suburban: "Chevy has been part of our family and a part of our work life on the farm for as long as I can remember," says Bryan. "If you were a Bryan, you drove a Chevy — and I'm a longtime Suburban owner. This partnership is a natural fit for me and this unique Suburban represents everything I and my family want for our outdoor adventures."

Aftermarket options
In 2011, Callaway Cars offered an upgraded Eaton supercharger package to the Suburban for an additional $15,995.

In 2014, Callaway once again offered a supercharged version of the new 2015 K2XX Suburban.

In 2015, Corsa Performance added a cat-back exhaust system package for customers looking to upgrade their K2XX Suburban or Yukon XL, which would give the 5.3-liter versions a 669% flow increase and the 6.2-liter versions a 342% flow increase.

In 2018, Freedom Mobility partnered with GM to have their trucks and SUVs equipped with features that will make it accessible to disabled and visible/hearing impaired drivers or passengers. The Suburban is among the selected vehicles that will be available with this option.

Military applications

When production of the CUCV II ended in 2000, GM redesigned it to coincide with civilian truck offerings. The CUCV nomenclature was changed to Light Service Support Vehicle in 2001. In 2005, LSSV production switched to AM General, a unit of MacAndrews and Forbes Holdings. The LSSV is a GM-built Chevrolet Silverado 1500, Chevrolet Silverado 2500 HD, Chevrolet Tahoe, or Chevrolet Suburban that is powered by a Duramax 6.6-liter turbo diesel engine. As GM has periodically redesigned its civilian trucks and SUVs from 2001 to the present, LSSVs have also been updated cosmetically.

The militarization of the standard GM trucks/SUVs to become LSSVs includes exterior changes such as CARC paint (Forest Green, Desert Sand, or 3-color Camouflage), blackout lights, military bumpers, a brush guard, a NATO slave receptacle/NATO trailer receptacle, a pintle hook, tow shackles, and a 24/12 volt electrical system. The dashboard has additional controls and dataplates. The truck also can be equipped with weapon supports in the cab, cargo tie-down hooks, folding troop seats, pioneer tools, winches, and other military accessories. In the Canadian Army these vehicles are nicknamed "Milverado".

The Enhanced Mobility Package (EMP) option adds an uprated suspension, 4-wheel anti-lock brakes, a locking rear differential, beadlock tires, a tire pressure monitoring system, and other upgrades. About 2,000 LSSV units have been sold to U.S. and international military and law enforcement organizations.

Variants
 Cargo/Troop Carrier Pickup (2-door, Extended Cab, or 4-door Silverado)
 Cargo/Troop Carrier/Command Vehicle (4-door Tahoe)
 Cargo/Troop Carrier/Command Vehicle/Ambulance (4-door Suburban)

Safety

National Highway Traffic Safety Administration (NTHSA)

2007–14
For the 2009 model year, the Suburban received the U.S. National Highway Traffic Safety Administration's (NHTSA) best rating of 5 stars in the frontal driver/passenger and side driver/passenger categories.

NHTSA Chevrolet Suburban crash test results (For 2009 models):
 Frontal Driver: 
 Frontal Passenger: 
 Side Driver: 
 Side Rear Passenger: 
 2WD Rollover: 
 4WD Rollover:

2015–present
For the 2015 model year, the Suburban received an NHTSA rating of 4 stars overall, with the side driver/passenger categories receiving 5 stars. (Because of more stringent tests, 2011 and newer model ratings are not comparable to 1990–2010 ratings.) The NHTSA gave the 2016 models 4 stars overall in its review, similar to its review of its 2015 models.

NHTSA Chevrolet Suburban crash test results (For 2015 models):
 Frontal Driver: 
 Frontal Passenger: 
 Side Driver: 
 Side Rear Passenger: 
 2WD Rollover: 
 4WD Rollover:

Insurance Institute for Highway Safety (IIHS)

1995–99 Suburban
The IIHS gave the Suburban an Acceptable rating along with the Chevrolet Tahoe, GMC Yukon, and Cadillac Escalade.

2000–06 Suburban
The Suburban, Chevrolet Tahoe, GMC Yukon, and Cadillac Escalade got a Good rating and a Best Pick. However, all four including the Yukon XL got a Good rating for head protection in side and seats and head restraints.

2007–14 Suburban
The Suburban, Chevrolet Tahoe, GMC Yukon and Cadillac Escalade earned a Good rating in the front offset. However, 2007–09 models without side airbags got a Poor rating. Models with them received a Marginal rating. 2010–14 models got a Top Safety Pick.

2015–2020 Suburban
All of the GMT K2XX SUVs received a top safety pick, except for the Chevrolet / GMC 1500 series pickups, which have not been tested. The pickups have been tested against the moderate overlap test, for which they received a good rating.

Recalls
On March 28, 2014, GM announced a recall on the 2015 Suburban and Yukon XL in order to fix a "transmission oil cooler line that is not securely seated in its fitting," causing the vehicle to stop and rupture the oil cooling line, resulting in the engine to malfunction and catch fire immediately. The move comes on the heels on an incident that happened on March 23, 2014, when a 2015 GMC Yukon caught fire in Anaheim, California during a test drive. Despite being an isolated incident, the 2015 Suburban and Yukon XL are not tied to GM's announced recall of its vehicles (from previous generation models and discontinued brands that were produced prior to, during, and after GM's restructuring in 2010) that was made on March 17, 2014.

On June 6, 2014, GM issued another recall on the 2015 Suburban and Yukon XL because their radio control modules may not work, and thus prevent certain audible safety warnings. This would be followed on June 27 with another recall, in which the transfer case "may electronically switch to neutral without input from the driver," adding that if this occurs while the vehicle is moving, power will not be sent to the wheels, meaning that if the vehicle is parked, it may roll away unexpectedly if the parking brake has not been set.

On December 5, 2014, GM announced that it is replacing ignition key units on the 2015 Suburban and Yukon XL after customers made complaints that the shift lever strikes the head of the key if the tilt-adjustable steering column is in the fully up position. The lever only can be moved out of "park" into a gear when the engine is running and the driver's foot is on the brake. The push-button ignition features are not affected.

On January 4, 2015, GM issued a recall on tenth-generation Suburbans and Yukon XLs from the 2011 and 2012 model years for a potential ignition lock actuator issue, citing that they are not the right size and can cause the ignition to get stuck in the "Start" position, and then either due to a jarring event or a "cool interior temperature" the ignition could switch back to the "Accessory" position, resulting in a loss of power assistance and prevent the airbags from deploying.

On December 30, 2015, the NHTSA revealed that it had received complaints from 2015 Suburban/Yukon XL owners about buffeting and vibration problems causing drivers and passengers to endure an annoying vibration inside the cabin so severe that it leads to dizziness and headaches. GM is aware of this and has moved to correct the situation and try to pinpoint the source, but assures the vehicles are safe to drive.

On May 3, 2016, GM placed a recall on both 2016 model Suburbans and Yukon XLs over inadequate welds on their upper front control arms, which could result in an accident or injury.

On February 4, 2017, GM issued a recall of 2016 and 2017 Chevrolet Suburban HD models over an improperly fixed right-hand rear-view outside mirror which GM says will be replaced for free. The recall affected 211 vehicles.

Awards

2003 - J.D. Power Highest ranked full-size SUV in initial quality
2004 - J.D. Power Highest ranked full-size SUV in initial quality
2005 - J.D. Power Highest ranked full-size SUV in initial quality
2014 - J.D. Power Highest ranked large SUV in initial quality
2014 - J.D. Power Most dependable large SUV (2011 GMC Yukon XL)
2015 - U.S. News Best Large SUV for Families
2015 - MotorWeek Drivers' Choice Awards Best Large Utility
2015 - Kelley Blue Book KBB.com Best Resale Value FULL-SIZE SUV/CROSSOVER
2015 - Car and Driver Editors' Choice Awards Best SUVs

Yearly U.S. sales 
In 1999, GM rebranded the GMC Suburban as the Yukon XL. GM discontinued tracking sales of the Yukon XL in 2018 and now includes them with the sales of the Yukon. From 2018 onward, this chart reflects only the number of Chevrolet Suburban units sold.

References

External links 

 
 GMC Yukon XL (twin vehicle)

All-wheel-drive vehicles
Suburban
Expanded length sport utility vehicles
Flexible-fuel vehicles
Military light utility vehicles
Motor vehicles manufactured in the United States
Rear-wheel-drive vehicles
Full-size sport utility vehicles
Luxury sport utility vehicles
Flagship vehicles
Station wagons
Cars introduced in 1933
1940s cars
1950s cars
1960s cars
1970s cars
1980s cars
1990s cars
2000s cars
2010s cars
2020s cars
Panel trucks
Carryalls